Euscorpiops karschi is a species of scorpion in the Euscorpiidae family, first found in Tibet and Yunnan, China.

According to a 2014 publication, the scorpion has been described with a chela, or pincer-like claw, with a "length to width ratio of 3.4 – 3.5, carapace with sparse, nearly equal granules, total length less than 50 mm (small species), [and] coloration basically dark red-brown."

References

Further reading
Sun, Dong, and Ming-Sheng Zhu. "One new species of scorpion belonging to the genus Euscorpiops Vachon, 1980 from Yunnan, China (Scorpiones: Euscorpiidae, Scorpiopinae)." Zootaxa 2399 (2010): 61-68.
Cao, Zhijian, et al. "Overview of scorpion species from China and their toxins." Toxins 6.3 (2014): 796-815.

Euscorpiidae
Scorpions of Asia
Animals described in 2005